In the geometry of hyperbolic 3-space, the order-6-3 square honeycomb or 4,6,3 honeycomb is a regular space-filling tessellation (or honeycomb). Each infinite cell consists of a hexagonal tiling whose vertices lie on a 2-hypercycle, each of which has a limiting circle on the ideal sphere.

Geometry
The Schläfli symbol of the order-6-3 square honeycomb is {4,6,3}, with three order-4 hexagonal tilings meeting at each edge. The vertex figure of this honeycomb is a hexagonal tiling, {6,3}.

Related polytopes and honeycombs 
It is a part of a series of regular polytopes and honeycombs with {p,6,3} Schläfli symbol, and dodecahedral vertex figures:

Order-6-3 pentagonal honeycomb

In the geometry of hyperbolic 3-space, the order-6-3 pentagonal honeycomb or 5,6,3 honeycomb is a regular space-filling tessellation (or honeycomb). Each infinite cell consists of an order-6 pentagonal tiling whose vertices lie on a 2-hypercycle, each of which has a limiting circle on the ideal sphere.

The Schläfli symbol of the order-6-3 pentagonal honeycomb is {5,6,3}, with three order-6 pentagonal tilings meeting at each edge. The vertex figure of this honeycomb is a hexagonal tiling, {6,3}.

Order-6-3 hexagonal honeycomb

In the geometry of hyperbolic 3-space, the order-6-3 hexagonal honeycomb or 6,6,3 honeycomb is a regular space-filling tessellation (or honeycomb). Each infinite cell consists of an order-6 hexagonal tiling whose vertices lie on a 2-hypercycle, each of which has a limiting circle on the ideal sphere.

The Schläfli symbol of the order-6-3 hexagonal honeycomb is {6,6,3}, with three order-5 hexagonal tilings meeting at each edge.  The vertex figure of this honeycomb is a hexagonal tiling, {6,3}.

Order-6-3 apeirogonal honeycomb

In the geometry of hyperbolic 3-space, the order-6-3 apeirogonal honeycomb or ∞,6,3 honeycomb is a regular space-filling tessellation (or honeycomb). Each infinite cell consists of an order-6 apeirogonal tiling whose vertices lie on a 2-hypercycle, each of which has a limiting circle on the ideal sphere.

The Schläfli symbol of the apeirogonal tiling honeycomb is {∞,6,3}, with three order-6 apeirogonal tilings meeting at each edge.  The vertex figure of this honeycomb is a hexagonal tiling, {6,3}.

The "ideal surface" projection below is a plane-at-infinity, in the Poincaré half-space model of H3. It shows an Apollonian gasket pattern of circles inside a largest circle.

See also 
 Convex uniform honeycombs in hyperbolic space
 List of regular polytopes

References 

Coxeter, Regular Polytopes, 3rd. ed., Dover Publications, 1973. . (Tables I and II: Regular polytopes and honeycombs, pp. 294–296)
 The Beauty of Geometry: Twelve Essays (1999), Dover Publications,  (Chapter 10, Regular Honeycombs in Hyperbolic Space) Table III
 Jeffrey R. Weeks The Shape of Space, 2nd edition  (Chapters 16–17: Geometries on Three-manifolds I,II)
 George Maxwell, Sphere Packings and Hyperbolic Reflection Groups, JOURNAL OF ALGEBRA 79,78-97 (1982) 
 Hao Chen, Jean-Philippe Labbé, Lorentzian Coxeter groups and Boyd-Maxwell ball packings, (2013)
 Visualizing Hyperbolic Honeycombs arXiv:1511.02851 Roice Nelson, Henry Segerman (2015)

External links 
John Baez, Visual insights: {7,3,3} Honeycomb (2014/08/01) {7,3,3} Honeycomb Meets Plane at Infinity (2014/08/14) 
 Danny Calegari, Kleinian, a tool for visualizing Kleinian groups, Geometry and the Imagination 4 March 2014. 

Honeycombs (geometry)
Square tilings
Isogonal 3-honeycombs
Isochoric 3-honeycombs
Order-6-n 3-honeycombs
Order-n-3 3-honeycombs
Regular 3-honeycombs